The Tonj River, also called the Ibba River or Nyatt Ayok, is a river of South Sudan. It is a right tributary of the Bahr el Ghazal River.

Course

The Tonj River is a tributary of the Bahr el Ghazal River.
The river originates in the south of the states of Western Equatoria not far from the border with Haut-Uélé in the Democratic Republic of the Congo.
It flows north from Western Equatoria through Tonj South County in Warrap into Unity State.
The central part of the river flows through the Southern National Park.
About the end of March this section is liable to be swollen by the early rains and cannot be forded by a motor vehicle.
After entering Warrap it passes the town of Tonj.
The river enters the Bahr el-Ghazal just north of Wancual airport.

Hydrology

Environment

The river is thickly forested in its upper valley, but further down there are strips of grass plain on either side and eventually, the forest gives way to an open grassy plain.
The river winds through a flood plain that gradually widens in its lower reaches.
To the north of Tonj, the river enters a large lagoon from which several small watercourses lead into a grass swamp.
Each year Warrap experiences flood from July to December, with some parts being totally isolated.

Notes

Citations

Sources

 Rivers of South Sudan